Thiadsvind also known as Theudesinda or Theodelinda (677 - ?) was a Frisian princess, the daughter of Redbad, King of the Frisians. In 711 she was married to Grimoald the Younger the eldest son of Pepin of Herstal. The marriage was officiated by archbishop or bishop of the Frisians Willibrord. Her husband had 2 illegitimate sons: Theudoald and Arnold.

References

Sources
 Liber Histoariae Francorum,
 Annales Mettenses.

Medieval Frisians
8th-century women
Frisian women
7th-century women